Somerville is a town in Barton Township, Gibson County, Indiana, United States. The population was 293 at the 2010 census, making it the third-smallest community in the county.

History
Somerville was originally called Summittville, and under the latter name was laid out in 1853. The post office opened as Somerville in 1854.

Geography
Somerville is located at  (38.278113, -87.377426).  The town lies northeast of Evansville in eastern Gibson County.  State Road 57 passes through Somerville, connecting the town with Oakland City to the northeast and Mackey to the southwest.

According to the 2010 census, Somerville has a total area of 0.312 square mile (0.81 km2), of which 0.31 square mile (0.80 km2) (or 99.36%) is land and 0.002 square mile (0.01 km2) (or 0.64%) is water.

Schools
Somerville and the easternmost half of Gibson County is served by the East Gibson School Corporation which currently operates five schools:

Wood Memorial High School (9–12)
Wood Memorial Junior High School (7–8)
Oakland City Elementary School (PK–6)
Francisco Elementary School (K–6)
Barton Township Elementary School (K–6)

Demographics

2010 census
As of the census of 2010, there were 293 people, 110 households, and 78 families living in the town. The racial makeup of the town was 98.6% White, 0.3% African American, 0.3% Native American, 0.3% from other races, and 0.3% from two or more races. Hispanic or Latino of any race were 2.4% of the population.

There were 110 households, of which 32.7% had children under the age of 18 living with them, 56.4% were married couples living together, 9.1% had a female householder with no husband present, 5.5% had a male householder with no wife present, and 29.1% were non-families. 25.5% of all households were made up of individuals, and 9% had someone living alone who was 65 years of age or older. The average household size was 2.66 and the average family size was 3.15.

The median age in the town was 36.9 years. 28.3% of residents were under the age of 18; 7.6% were between the ages of 18 and 24; 23.2% were from 25 to 44; 24.5% were from 45 to 64; and 16.4% were 65 years of age or older. The gender makeup of the town was 50.9% male and 49.1% female.

2000 census
As of the census of 2000, there were 312 people, 124 households, and 81 families living in the town. The racial makeup of the town was 99.04% White, 0.64% African American, 0.32% from other races. Hispanic or Latino of any race were 0.32% of the population.

There were 124 households, out of which 28.2% had children under the age of 18 living with them, 59.7% were married couples living together, 5.6% had a female householder with no husband present, and 33.9% were non-families. 30.6% of all households were made up of individuals, and 16.9% had someone living alone who was 65 years of age or older. The average household size was 2.52 and the average family size was 3.18.

In the town, the population was spread out, with 24.7% under the age of 18, 4.8% from 18 to 24, 30.8% from 25 to 44, 24.4% from 45 to 64, and 15.4% who were 65 years of age or older. The median age was 40 years. For every 100 females, there were 89.1 males. For every 100 females age 18 and over, there were 86.5 males.

The median income for a household in the town was $34,464, and the median income for a family was $43,750. Males had a median income of $30,750 versus $22,083 for females. The per capita income for the town was $12,147. About 3.3% of families and 5.2% of the population were below the poverty line, including 4.3% of those under age 18 and 7.9% of those age 65 or over.

References

Towns in Gibson County, Indiana